A Rare Live Recording Of Billie Holiday is a live album by jazz singer Billie Holiday, compiling material recorded over two nights at Boston's Storyville Club in 1951, and released by the small Recording Industries Corporation label in 1964. The material was originally broadcast on the radio station WMEX. The album documents one of the few recordings of Holiday performing her live set at a nightclub.

Content 

The recordings on the album were posthumously released by a small label in the 1960s, sourced from a series of radio broadcasts made on Boston's WMEX, live from city's Storyville Club in 1951. Late that year, Holiday had performed for a week in the club, accompanied by the pianist and arranger Buster Harding and a rhythm section. She was interviewed at the time by Nat Hentoff, a local jazz critic and historian working for WMEX as well as Down Beat, who described her as being at the time joyful, responsible, and cooperative, due to her recent marriage to Louis McKay. As well as arriving on time for every set, she volunteered to perform extra sets specifically for the radio broadcast. Sharing the bill was Stan Getz, who Holiday praised for his ability to swing, and the two collaborated for several tunes that were also broadcast and included in this album.

The material on this album has been rereleased many times since, sometimes with different artwork and title, and sometimes adding other songs sourced from the same series of WMEX radio broadcasts.

Track listing 

Side One
 Billie's Blues (Billie Holiday) 2:53  
 Lover Man (Jimmy Davis, Roger ("Ram") Ramirez, and James Sherman) 2:55  
 Them There Eyes (Maceo Pinkard, Doris Tauber and William Tracey) 1:40  
 My Man (Jacques Charles, Channing Pollock, Albert Willemetz, and Maurice Yvain, Intro-Holiday) 3:14  
 I Cover The Waterfront (Johnny Green Edward Heyman) 3:35  
 Crazy He Calls Me (Carl Sigman and Bob Russell) 2:11  
 Lover Come Back To Me (Sigmund Romberg, Oscar Hammerstein II) 2:33  
Side Two
 Detour Ahead (Herb Ellis, John Frigo, and Lou Carter) 2:24  
 Strange Fruit (Abel Meeropol) 3:16  
 Drivin' Me Crazy (Walter Donaldson ) 1:31  
 Ain't Nobody's Business If I Do (Porter Grainger and Everett Robbins ) 2:58  
 All Of Me (Gerald Marks and Seymour Simons ) 1:41  
 I Loves You Porgy (George Gershwin and Ira Gershwin) 3:06  
 Miss Brown To You (Richard A. Whiting, Ralph Rainger, and Leo Robin) 1:52

Personnel 
tracks a1-7, b1, b4-7: November 1, 1951
 Bass, John Fields 
 Drums, Marquis Foster
 Piano, Buster Harding

tracks b2-b3: October 28, 1951
 Announcer, Nat Hentoff
 Bass, John Fields / Teddy Kotick
 Drums, Marquis Foster
 Guitar, Jimmy Raney
 Piano, Al Haig / Buster Harding
 Tenor Sax, Stan Getz
 Art Direction, Illustration, Burt Goldblatt
 Liner Notes, Nat Hentoff

References 

Billie Holiday albums
1964 live albums